Diez may refer to:

Diez (surname)
Diez, a sports newspaper in Bolivia
Diez (Honduras), a newspaper in Honduras
Diez or X, an album by Intocable
10 (number) in Spanish.
Diez, Germany, a town in Rhineland-Palatinate
Diez (Verbandsgemeinde), a collective municipality in Rhineland-Palatinate

See also 
 Dietz